Fetzer is a surname. Notable people with the surname include:

Bill Fetzer (1884–1959), American football, basketball, and baseball coach
Bob Fetzer (1887–1968), American football coach and track and field coach
Brigitte Fetzer (born 1956), German volleyball player
Christine Fetzer, American bodybuilder and model
Emil B. Fetzer (1916–2009), American architect
Herman Fetzer (1899–1935), American writer, poet and columnist
James H. Fetzer (born 1940), American conspiracy theorist and writer
John Fetzer (1901–1991), American businessman and Major League Baseball executive
John Fetzer (born 1840), American politician
Tom Fetzer (born 1955), American politician